Delightfulee is an album by jazz trumpeter Lee Morgan released on the Blue Note label in 1967. It was recorded on April 8 & May 27, 1966 and features performances by Morgan with a quintet featuring Joe Henderson, McCoy Tyner, Bob Cranshaw and Billy Higgins and a big band featuring Ernie Royal, Tom McIntosh, Jim Buffington, Don Butterfield, Phil Woods, Wayne Shorter, Danny Bank and Philly Joe Jones with arrangements by Oliver Nelson.

Reception
The Allmusic review by Michael G. Nastos awarded the album 4½ stars stating "For some this will always be an oddball release of Morgan's, but it does suggest moving on into what would be a fruitful and successful final five years".

Track listing 
All compositions by Lee Morgan except where noted
 "Ca-Lee-So" - 5:34
 "Zambia" - 6:33
 "Yesterday" (John Lennon, Paul McCartney) - 5:49
 "Sunrise, Sunset" (Jerry Bock, Sheldon Harnick) - 6:17
 "Nite Flite" - 7:38
 "The Delightful Deggie" - 6:38
 "Need I?" - 7:11 Bonus track on CD
 "Filet of Soul (aka Hoppin' John)" - 8:30 Bonus track on CD
 "Zambia" [Big Band Version] - 8:01 Bonus track on CD
 "The Delightful Deggie" [Big Band Version] - 5:49 Bonus track on CD

Recorded on April 8 (#3, 4, 7-10) & May 27 (#1, 2, 5, 6), 1966.

Personnel 
Tracks 1, 2, 5, 6
 Lee Morgan - trumpet
 Joe Henderson - tenor saxophone
 McCoy Tyner - piano
 Bob Cranshaw - bass
 Billy Higgins - drums

Tracks 3, 4, 7-10
 Lee Morgan, Ernie Royal - trumpet
 Tom McIntosh - trombone
 Jim Buffington - French horn
 Don Butterfield - tuba
 Phil Woods - alto saxophone, flute
 Wayne Shorter - tenor saxophone
 Danny Bank - baritone saxophone, bass clarinet, flute
 McCoy Tyner - piano
 Bob Cranshaw - bass
 Philly Joe Jones - drums
 Oliver Nelson - arranger

References 

Hard bop albums
Lee Morgan albums
1967 albums
Blue Note Records albums
Albums produced by Alfred Lion
Albums recorded at Van Gelder Studio